The men's points race competition at the 2019  UEC European Track Championships was held on 19 October 2019.

Results
160 laps (40 km) were raced with 16 sprints.

References

Men's points race
European Track Championships – Men's points race